Joseph Conners (born 28 May 1987) is an English professional wrestler. Conners competed in many British wrestling promotions, most notably New Generation Wrestling (NGW) and What Culture Pro Wrestling (WCPW), where he was a one-time WCPW Champion. In 2017 and 2018 he took part in WWE's UK Championship Tournament, and until 2021 competed on WWE's NXT UK brand.

Training 
Joseph Conners trained at the House Of Pain Wrestling Academy under veteran UK wrestler Stixx.

Professional wrestling career

What Culture Pro Wrestling (2016–2017) 
On 24 August 2016, at What Culture Pro Wrestling's Stacked event, Conners defeated Big Damo, Joe Hendry (whom he had betrayed) and Rampage in a Fatal four-way match to become WCPW Champion. Conners would successfully defend the championship against El Ligero, Drew Galloway, Martin Kirby, Cody Rhodes and Joe Hendry, at various WCPW events, as well as against "Darkside" James Scott outside of WCPW territory. At Delete: WCPW on 30 November 2016, Conners lost the championship to Drew Galloway in a triple threat match, also featuring Joe Hendry.

At WCPW KirbyMania, Conners returned for the first time since signing his WWE United Kingdom Championship Tournament contract, attacking Joe Hendry during his match with Drake, setting up a no holds barred match between the two, ultimately losing via submission After an almost 9-month absence Conners returned to WCPW as a surprise entrant into the Pro Wrestling World Cup round of 16 replacing Michael Elgin who had to drop out due to a scheduling conflict. Conners defeated Joe Coffey in Elgin's stead to advance to the quarterfinals the next night where once again he was successful in defeating his opponent, Hiromu Takahashi, and advancing to the semifinals. However, two nights later, he would lose his semifinal match against Kushida after passing out to Kushida's Hoverboard Lock.

WWE (2016–2021) 
On 15 December 2016 it was revealed that Conners would be one of 16 men competing in a two-night tournament to crown the first ever WWE United Kingdom Champion on 14 and 15 January 2017. Conners defeated James Drake in the first round, advancing to the quarter finals, where he was defeated by Mark Andrews. In November 2017 Conners returned to WWE and competed in several dark matches and on several house shows. On the November 7 episode of 205 Live, Conners returned to WWE programming for one night in Manchester, England to participate in an in-ring segment with Enzo Amore and other wrestlers from the WWE UK tournament. Later in the episode he would team with James Drake in a tag team match against Cedric Alexander and Mark Andrews in a losing effort. He returned to 205 Live in 2018, teaming with Drew Gulak and James Drake in a losing effort to Cedric Alexander, Flash Morgan Webster, and Mustafa Ali. He would then go on to compete in the 2018 WWE United Kingdom Championship Tournament, losing to Ashton Smith in the first round. In late 2021, Conners left NXT UK.

Independent circuit (2022–present) 
In January, 2022, Conners made his Italian return at SIW mothership show "Giorno del Giudizio". After taking part to a No.1 contendership battle royal, he was a fixture to SIW's Twitch weekly telecast, "SIW System", finally forcing his way to an Italian Title match against champion Tempesta at their February "Back to War" System TV special, which he lost via roll-up.

On February 5, 2022 it was announced that Conners was to make his return to the ring North Wrestling Triple Threat Match for the NW Championship Rory Coyle vs Liam Slater.

He then returned to SIW, defeating the No.1 contender Darko, making the match for the Italian championship at "TuttoxTutto" a triple threat. At "TuttoxTutto" he lost the match when he tapped out to Tempesta's Sharpshooter.

Championships and accomplishments
APEX Wrestling
APEX Heavyweight Champion (1 Time, Current)
British Wrestling Revolution
 BWR Heavyweight Championship (2 time)
BWR Heavyweight Championship Tournament (2017)
Riot Rumble (2019)
Dansk Pro Wrestling
 DPW Tag Team Championship (1 time, currant) - with Dan Evans 
Hungarian Championship Wrestling
 HCW Revolution Champion (1 time, current)
Leicester Championship Wrestling
LCW Championship (1 time)
LCW Tag Team Champion (2 times) – with Paul Malen (1) and Stixx (1)
Norton British Wrestling
 Shining Star Tournament
 Pro Wrestling Illustrated
 Ranked No. 235 of the top 500 singles wrestlers in the PWI 500 in 2019
Scoula Italiana Wrestling
SIW Wild Championship (1 time)
Southside Wrestling Entertainment
SWE (World) Heavyweight Championship (3 times)
 SWE Tag Team Championship (3 times) – with Paul Malen (1), Jimmy Havoc (1), and El Ligero (1)
Sovereign Pro Wrestling
Sov Pro Wrestling World Championship (1 time, Current)
Tidal Championship Wrestling
TCW Championship (1 time)
TNT Extreme Wrestling
 TNT World Championship (1 time)
What Culture Pro Wrestling
 WCPW Championship (1 time)

References

External links

1987 births
Living people
English male professional wrestlers
Sportspeople from Leicestershire